William Cameron Townsend (July 9, 1896 – April 23, 1982) was an American Christian missionary-linguist who founded Wycliffe Bible Translators and the Summer Institute of Linguistics (now SIL International), both: emphasized the translation of the Bible into minority languages, the development of literacy, and bilingual education programs.

Early life
Born in 1896 in Southern California, Townsend graduated from Santa Ana High School and attended Occidental College in Los Angeles, but dropped out to serve for several years as a Bible salesman for the Los Angeles Bible House.

Work in Guatemala

Under the auspices of the Los Angeles Bible House he sailed to Guatemala in 1917 to sell Spanish Bibles near Antigua. After two years he joined the Central American Mission (CAM), an evangelical Christian mission of the Disciples of Christ among the Kaqchikel Maya people in Guatemala, founded by Protestant revivalists who had agreed to divide their mission work in Central America into various regions. CAM taught that Jesus Christ's Millennial Kingdom of Peace would come after the Second Coming of Christ and viewed their mission as necessary to fulfill Christ's Great Commission to carry his message "to the ends of the earth" (Acts 1:8). Unlike his predecessors, Townsend did not deem social reform as a wasted effort. He was also concerned that CAM's Christian message, spread exclusively in Spanish, could not reach the monolingual majority of the indigenous population.

Townsend settled in a Kaqchikel community on the coast called Santa Catarina, and over the next fourteen years learned the language to the point where he could translate the Bible. He also founded the Robinson Bible Institute which, with financial backing from U.S. sources, built a center for the indigenous community that included a school, medical clinic (supplied with effective western treatments for prevalent parasites like hookworm), an electrical generator, a coffee processing plant, and an agricultural supply store. During these years, Townsend's concern for the impoverished and excluded condition of the Latin American Indians grew, and he became convinced that the missionary practices he observed did not address the needs of indigenous people groups effectively, and did not take into account their diverse languages and cultures.

Search for solutions
As Townsend sought the root causes of indigenous poverty and marginalization, he found them first in the mixed-race ladino middlemen who acted as the sole economic and social portal to the broader regional and national society for mainly monolingual indigenous communities, and who were closely associated with a "folk" Catholic religion that was quite distinct from orthodox Catholicism. These elites had a vested interest in maintaining the economic and social status quo, and therefore had no desire to improve the Indians' economic situation, educational level or degree of bilingualism.

Secondly, Townsend, while valuing indigenous languages and cultures as divine creations, also believed that not all aspects of human culture were positive, including some of those found within Mesoamerican indigenous societies. Within them he found various types of oppression, some of which were similar to those the dominant Spanish culture imposed. Numerous saints required many days of festivals laden with the obligatory purchases and excessive consumption of food and alcohol, much of which needed to be purchased from the ladino middlemen. Modern healthcare was not available in most communities, which were served only by spiritualist 'curers' who required payment but often provided ineffective care. Townsend thus viewed the Maya who surrounded him as trapped from both within and without, and he searched for an exit strategy, a way to liberate them from the forces holding them back.

Problems to address
Townsend viewed true conversion to Christ as a solution to the challenges of indigenous peoples, but he had to first confront the question of why the current Protestant missions did not attract many indigenous converts, and why Catholic missions had failed to produce Christians who were more orthodox in their beliefs. The primary answer he found was that the illiterate monolinguals had no access to scripture. Many Indians could not read, and even those who could, did not have the Bible in a language they could understand. Although heterodox syncretism was the norm in indigenous communities, the Catholic clergy refused Bible translation, fearing exegesis which did not agree with Catholic tradition.  The Protestant missions concentrated on Spanish-speaking ladino overseers as converts instead of on the speakers of minority indigenous languages. According to Colby and Dennet (a less-than-objective and not very reliable source), Townsend's CAM superiors also showed signs of unease that he had adopted indigenous cultural practices, clothing, and language.

In the end, Townsend developed a philosophy of mission that sought to produce indigenous-run, self-sufficient, Bible-based Christian congregations. He believed that if this goal were achieved, it could also contribute to a positive restructuring of cultural institutions that could lead to a more just society. To promote that, he included various parallel programs alongside Bible translation to provide prerequisite knowledge and skills to indigenous communities. One very important step toward this goal was the development of groups of indigenous people who were literate, first in their own language and later in Spanish as well, and to help them produce a translation of at least the New Testament and key parts of the Old Testament in their native tongue. Townsend firmly believed that if the Christian Scriptures were well translated and well understood, they had the power to change individuals and society for the better. He often said that the Bible in the language of the people was the best missionary of all, because it "never got sick, never took a furlough, and never sounded like a foreigner".

The importance of linguistics in Bible translation
Townsend realized that, in order to meet the goal of well-translated Scriptures, Bible translators needed to complete an in-depth study of descriptive linguistics. This emergent academic specialty, freshly invigorated by the first widespread publications of Edward Sapir (1921) and Leonard Bloomfield (1933) could provide Townsend's translator recruits with the deeper understanding of language they needed to do translation well. Having already used some of Sapir's insights in his analysis of Kaqchikel, Townsend understood the importance of linguistic theory in the training of those who would translate Scripture into many indigenous languages. Once given access to the rural communities, they would work with local language speakers to learn their language, produce an alphabet for that language, publish literature that preserved local stories, histories, folk tales and other aspects of the culture, develop literacy materials and set up literacy programs, help provide modern healthcare and supplies, and eventually complete Bible translation work. Translation and conversion thus would happen in the context of a series of developments in the society that would equip minority people groups to cope with the outside world more effectively.

Where to send the first linguist/translators
As this Bible translation movement developed, Townsend moved from Guatemala to Mexico to Peru, with a special focus on the vast Amazon basin. For centuries the tribes of the Amazon had been evangelized by the Jesuits until their expulsion from the Portuguese empire in the late eighteenth century. They had been targeted by slave catchers, rubber tappers, and even some military operations.  Many of the Amazonian indigenous groups remained elusive, always relying on the size and inhospitable nature of the terrain to enable them to fade away and maintain isolation. Townsend proposed using airplanes, and a radio network to contact and to stay connected with the isolated tribes, but the complexity and cost of such an operation baffled less technologically minded missionaries. In the opinion of some, individual Bible translations would be incredibly labor-intensive and reach only tiny populations there. Also, as mentioned, the concept of indigenous-run congregations in native tongues ran counter to the traditional practices of more traditional evangelical missionaries in Guatemala.

Sometime between 1931 and 1933 Townsend decided to move to Mexico as the initial operational theater instead of to the Amazon.  The first piece fell into place in Panajachel, Guatemala, when he met by chance (or divine arrangement) with Moisés Sáenz, Mexican Under-Secretary of Education, who was vacationing and visiting rural schools. The two became friends. Sáenz left a letter expressing his commendation of Townsend's work in Guatemala and his offer to welcome him to Mexico. Sick with tuberculosis and convinced that there would be little support for his ideas in Guatemala, Townsend returned to the United States in 1932 and sought the help of L.L. Legters, the field secretary of the Pioneer Mission Agency and a trusted friend. At a prayer meeting in August 1933 "'the Lord revealed his will for... Mr. WC Townsend of Guatemala to make a trip to Mexico City for the purpose of meeting with the government to get permission for sending men into the Indian tribes to learn the languages and to translate the Bible into those Indian tongues.'" Just two months later, a letter from Sáenz arrived urging the two men, Townsend and Legters, to visit Mexico.

Mexico and the founding of SIL

The initial visit

The winning faction of the Mexican Revolution created the Constitution of 1917, which extended the anticlerical measures of the liberal Constitution of 1857 restricting the Catholic Church in Mexico. Townsend and Legters, however, entered Mexico without missionary credentials. Having cut all formal organizational ties, including those to the Central American Mission, the two men used Sáenz's letter of invitation to cross the border and make their way to Mexico City. This instance represents the first of what later critical authors would view as 'deceits,' whereby the two men concealed their deeper goal behind a veil of government sanctity. In reality, the letter was the only basis they had to enter Mexico, and it had to be on a personal level, since SIL did not yet exist as an institution. There was no deceit, because Sáenz knew why Townsend wanted to come to Mexico. The goal of the anti-clerical 1917 Mexican constitution was to reduce the power of the Catholic Church in Mexico. By coming as lay people, without sacrificing or hiding their Christian beliefs, Townsend and Legters, in fact, acted in accordance with the law and its intent.

The second key to success in Mexico was Townsend's understanding of the importance of personal connections. His humility, warmth, keen willingness to serve others and also to ask others for help, opened doors to many important figures. During the first trip Townsend and Legters made contact with some friendly Americans and also Mexican officials in venues ranging from dinner parties to embassy lounges and while touring rural schools. Key among these was Rafael Ramírez, director of rural education in the Ministry of Public Education (SEP). Some critics have claimed that, cautious of rejection, Townsend only indirectly and subtly referenced the subjects of religion and Bible translation in his conversations, and thus left the officials enough room for plausible deniability. It is true that in legal documents signed between SIL and governments, the translation of the Bible was sometimes officially stated somewhat indirectly as "...the translation of literary works of high moral value", but Townsend and others inside the Bible translation movement state that the officials signing the documents always knew exactly what that meant, so there was no deceit involved. Townsend always claimed that SIL was an academic institution that applied original linguistic research to the solution of human problems and to the creation of an indigenous literature that included both the collection and publication in written form of previously oral histories and stories and the translation of "works of high moral value", especially the Bible, but also often including the sections of national constitutions most relevant to indigenous rights, and later the translation of the U.N. Universal Declaration of Human Rights. He explained that, although SIL was not a religious institution per se, its members were lay Christians motivated by their faith to serve the minority language groups of the world. He was also far from circumspect in relating to secular dignitaries, often inviting them to read a passage from the Bible before sharing a meal.

As just one example, after being invited to Chapultepec Castle by Mexican President Lázaro Cárdenas for a dinner to honor him and his newly arrived linguists, Townsend reported saying to the president: "I told him that our young people believed the Bible from cover to cover. They lived according to its teachings, which revealed to them God's love in sending His own Son to serve the needy and to save the lost. Our young people want to follow His example as well as they can by serving the Indians in practical ways, lending whatever assistance to the Mexican government they may and also translating that wonderful revelation of God to humanity into the Indian languages." It is difficult to see indirectness, subtlety or "plausible deniability" in that explanation of intention, given to the highest governmental authority in Mexico.

The fact that the non-sectarian SIL linguists cooperated with Catholics, Protestants and secularists alike, did not found churches themselves, did not occupy leadership positions in indigenous churches or perform any clerical functions, such as baptisms, marriages or funerals made categorizing them difficult. Even within SIL there was some debate as to whether they should define themselves as true "missionaries" or not. They were certainly not traditional sectarian missionaries, yet their vision included, among many other humanitarian goals, that of providing minority language communities with access to the Bible, and then trusting that the Christian Scriptures would bring about positive spiritual as well as material transformations in individuals and societies, a missionary-like goal.

A third and final key to the organization's success in Mexico was the congruence of Townsend's philosophy and proposed plan with a body of intellectual thought that had already begun to circulate in the Mexican intelligentsia, called indigenismo. Many Mexican intellectuals had begun to believe in the gradual incorporation of indigenous cultures into the national society while still preserving those original cultures by applying the principles of cultural anthropology and linguistics. Advances in these fields of study would lead to more effective and respectful systems of cultural and linguistic integration (particularly through the use of bilingual education rather than the imposition of Spanish on minority language speakers at the elementary school level). The goals included the eventual incorporation of indigenous cultures within the national one, while still preserving cultural diversity. The great similarity between indigenismo and Townsend's philosophy of ministry was demonstrated by an extremely significant encounter in the plaza of the small Mexican village of Tetelcingo. 

On January 21, 1936, President Lázaro Cárdenas, known for his extensive visitations to the countryside, paid a visit to a small town just south of Mexico City where Townsend had set up a project. We don't know all the reasons for this visit, and for the resulting friendship between the two men. Both men shared a singular concern for the well-being of the indigenous people of Mexico. Townsend's program, which combined "linguistic research, practical help, and spiritual guidance" perhaps meshed well with Cárdenas' general preoccupation with educating indigenous people. Regardless of the possible reasons for the visit, the result was a deep and lasting friendship (Cárdenas was the best-man at Townsend's wedding) and a ringing written endorsement of Townsend's work from Mexico's revered President.  The events of the previous twenty years of Townsend's life came to fruition at that meeting, which solidified the welcome his linguists received in Mexico for many years to come.

Townsend and Legters had opened Camp Wycliffe in Arkansas in the summer of 1934. Named for John Wycliffe, who was responsible for the first complete English translation of the Bible, the camp was designed to train young people in basic linguistics and translation methods. That first year only two students enrolled. The following year, after a training session with five men in attendance (including Kenneth Pike who would become a lifelong friend and prominent academic linguist), Townsend took his students to Mexico to begin field work. Despite the warm welcome afforded the translators in Mexico, Townsend still dreamed of expanding the work into the Amazon and beyond. From this small beginning has grown the worldwide ministry of the Summer Institute of Linguistics (now called simply SIL International), Wycliffe Bible Translators (WBT), and the technical and logistics partner of SIL known as JAARS.

Peru

Kenneth Pike was the first SIL representative to visit Peru in late 1943. SIL signed a contract with the Peruvian Ministry of Education on June 28, 1945. Colby and Dennet, in a book based heavily on imaginative speculation and their own ideological assumptions, claim that in Peru and later expansions, Townsend "found [his] mission tailor-made to the needs of U.S. policymakers... American missionaries had always accompanied American businesses abroad, but the political climate in postwar Latin America gave Townsend's new crop of missionary translators and educators a special appeal to U.S. ambassadors who were charged with securing markets and resources for the American economy." However, as far as anyone has been able to discover, Townsend did not think at all in the way described by Colby and Dennet. His consuming focus was on serving God and minority language groups by means of education, applied linguistics and Bible translation. His interest in economics grew out of that and was directed almost exclusively at the local and regional levels. In Peru, he hoped that literacy, general education and technical training combined with the moral and ethical values taught in the Bible would help free minority language speakers from their dependence on outside middlemen, especially the jungle "patrones" who exploited the labor and land resources of the Amazonian peoples. His main excursion into the international economic arena was to write a short book (80 pages) in English explaining the abuses of international oil companies in Mexico and defending the Cardenas government's nationalization of them, the exact opposite political stance from the one Colby and Dennet attribute to Townsend's thought and work. (See W.C. Townsend, The Truth about Mexico's Oil, 1940, SIL). Also counter to their claims, as far as we can discover, Townsend never coordinated anything with Nelson Rockefeller, and probably did not even know him.

The Jungle Aviation and Radio Service (JAARS)

By 1948 Townsend created the third important corporation tied to SIL: the Jungle Aviation and Radio Service. Until this point operations were held together shakily only by a jeep and several two-way radios provided by the U.S. Embassy. A U.S. Army Air Corps mission pilot, Larry Montgomery, contacted Townsend in 1946, informing him that a Grumman Duck, a navy amphibious plane, was on sale as army surplus for a cheap price. The plane proved its worth and even served as the sole rescue transport for a crashed Peruvian military plane in 1947, but also required a hefty additional investment to achieve all the potential that Townsend envisioned. Furthermore, a small fleet of planes would also require a hangar, runway, mechanics, more pilots, fuel, and parts. The missing piece was funding. Townsend sought money successfully by soliciting several wealthy evangelicals including the son and heir of Quaker Oats founder Henry P. Crowell. The project also received many smaller gifts from civic organizations, churches and individuals, and thus JAARS was born.

Notes

Bibliography

 Hugh Steven: Wycliffe in the Making: The Memoirs of W. Cameron Townsend, 1920–1933 (Wheaton, Harold Shaw 1995).
 Ruth A. Tucker: From Jerusalem to Irian Jaya: A Biographical History of Christian Missions (Zondervan ), p. 376f.
 Virginia Garrard-Burnett: A History of Protestantism in Guatemala: Living in the New Jerusalem (University of Texas Press), .
 Larry Ziegler-Otero: Resistance in an Amazonian Community: Huaorani Organizing Against the Global Economy (Berghahn Books), p. 52ff.
 James C. and Marti Hefley: Uncle Cam: The Story of William Cameron Townsend (Hodder & Stoughton Ltd. 1975)
 Janet and Geoff Benge: "Cameron Townsend: Good news in every language" (YWAM 2000)
 
 William Cameron Townsend: "The Truth about Mexico's Oil" (SIL 1940).

External links
 Calvin Hibbard: William Cameron Townsend Stimulator of linguistic research among ethnic minorities and champion of their cultural dignity. The official biography at the SIL website ( the same biography]) is also on the Wycliffe website.
 Books and articles written by William Cameron Townsend
 Extensive biography on Wycliffe's website
 March 2014 video of the history of Wycliffe's work in the Americas highlights Townsend's initiatives in the beginning years of the organizations he founded

1896 births
1982 deaths
People from Eastvale, California
American evangelicals
American Presbyterian missionaries
Presbyterian missionaries in Guatemala
Presbyterian missionaries in Mexico
Creators of writing systems
Translators of the Bible into indigenous languages of the Americas
Translators to English
Leaders of Christian parachurch organizations
20th-century translators
Compton High School alumni
Missionary linguists
American expatriates in Guatemala
American expatriates in Mexico